Fluorsid S.p.A. is an Italian company active in the chemical and mining industry, and precisely involved in the production and sales of inorganic fluorine derivatives.

The historic production site is located in Macchiareddu, in the industrial area of Cagliari, in Sardinia, but the company has plants and headquarters also located in the Italian peninsula, Norway, Switzerland and United Kingdom.

History 
Historically, since the Neolithic era, the populations that have inhabited Sardinia have always exploited the mineral wealths and varieties present in its subsoil. These mining activities grew considerably between the nineteenth and twentieth centuries: in 1850 there were more than 250 mining concessions. This period was dominated by the extraction of lead and zinc which made the fortune of Arburese, Iglesiente and the Barony of Siniscola regions. The sector, however, went into crisis after the Second World War and many of these mines were closed or downsized. On the contrary, however, in the same period there has been a boom in the fluorine and barium extraction sector, especially in Gerrei area. Therefore, many entrepreneurs, supported by the Autonomous Region of Sardinia through the Sardinian Mining Authority (it. Ente Minerario Sardo), chose to invest in this new business. Among these figures there was also Count Enrico Giulini, who already obtained the first mining concessions in 1953 and a few years later, on April 17, 1969, he founded Fluorsid based in the Genna Tres Montis mine, in the municipality of Silius. The company was specialized in the production of synthetic cryolite and aluminum fluoride. It immediately built on site a drying and bagging plant for fluorspar as well as one for briquetting the fluorite for steel and wet process, implemented in 1972. This process will be used until 1988, when it was decided to switch to dry production.

At the end of the 1980s, however, the problem of the enlargement of the ozone hole emerged: chlorofluorocarbons were considered the main culprits and some of these compounds were banned by the 1987 Montreal Protocol. This led to a strong crisis in the chemical industry linked to the production of florides (in particular hydrofluoric acid), for which the Silìus mine also entered into crisis. The Autonomous Region of Sardinia therefore decided to separate the mining sector from the production and commercial side, taking charge of the first aspect and contributing to 80% of the capital of the mines in Gerrei. Since 1990, Fluorsid left Silius and its business focused in the production and marketing of fluoroderivatives purchasing the raw material from other mines in the world, such as in South Africa, Morocco and China. In 2006, 100% of the raw materials were imported.

However, Sardinia had not been abandoned, on the contrary the industrial site of Macchiareddu was expanded, in the industrial area of Assemini, near Cagliari: in 2002 the sulfuric acid plant was started up with the production of steam by electricity and at the same time in the new Millennium the company began to grow at worldwide level and acquire other companies in the sector, also thanks to the arrival in 2005 of Tommaso Giulini, son of the founder, Count Enrico, who inherited the head of the company in 2005. With the closure of the Sardinian mines, in fact, the goal was to take advantage of the energy produced on site and, at the same time, increase production capacity, focus on innovative technologies and diversify production by focusing on the aluminum sector in order to seek new outlets in the Arab and Persian Gulf markets.

In fact, in 2010 ICIB was acquired, at the time the Italian leader in the market of hydrofluoric acid in solution and synthetic anhydride. Two years later British Fluorspar began mining fluorite in Derbyshire. In 2013 the Swiss office in Lausanne began trading metals, chemicals and minerals and three years later Fluorsid acquired the Norwegian company Noralf with an investment of 12.5 million euros, buying the second largest European plant for production of aluminum fluoride. In 2017 it acquired the SFM plant in Martigny, Switzerland, dedicated to the production of magnesium, and the English company Active Metals, leader in the production of titanium powders and granules in Sheffield plant. The following year, on the other hand, it acquired 50% of Simplis Logistics, the logistics platform in Bahrain for trade in Asian markets.

In Italy, in 2018, the chemical company Alkeemia was acquired together with its former Solvay plant in Porto Marghera for the production of anhydrous hydrofluoric acid, and in 2021 was created Fluorsid Deutschland, a German section born with the acquisition of 50% of CF Carbons, manufacturer of Chlorodifluoromethane, called also R22, in Frankfurt. However in October of the same year, Fluorsid sold both the subsidiary Alkeemia, including the related assets, namely the Porto Marghera plant, and the investment in Germany to a fund managed by the English investment company Blantyre Capital Limited.

Since 2019 all the subsidiaries of the Fluorsid Group have been unified and controlled under the Fluorsid brand.

Products 
The company develops the entire fluorine chain, from the extraction of fluorite to hydrofluoric acid, with the production and marketing of its derivatives as well as the sale of non-ferrous metals dedicated to the aluminum, fluoropolymer and steel markets, but also to the production of gypsum and anhydrite for the construction sector. The production of sulfuric acid serves the producers of fertilizers, synthetic detergents and pharmaceutical companies.

Among the chemical products there are high density aluminum fluoride made with dry process, anhydrous hydrofluoric acid in aqueous version (from 2018 to 2021 even in anidrous form in Porto Marghera plant, then sold), sulfuric acid from molten sulfur with the Double Contact Double Absorption process, synthetic cryolite, fluorite (a raw material for many subsequent processes), calcium fluoride and R22, raw material for the production of many fluoropolymers. Fluorsid produces also calcium sulphate in various forms (raw, milled or granular) and it is sold under the trade name Gypsos.

As for metals, the company is the leading European producer of powders, granules and shavings of magnesium and exports worldwide over 90% of its annual production as well as powders and granules of titanium. Through partner companies then exchanges and produces base metals (copper, zinc, lead, nickel, tin and aluminum), ferrous and non-ferrous alloys, semi-finished metals, steel and other metals for refining, and produces of catalysts and for high-precision applications.

Headquarters and production plants 

The administrative headquarters and the offices of the company are located in via Vegezio Milan, in the Citylife district, while the production plants are scattered in several countries in Europe.

The company's first plant, that is as well the registered office, is located in Macchiareddu (in the territory of Assemini), an industrial area on the outskirts of Cagliari, in Sardinia. It has been built when fluorite was still extracted in Gerrei. Here aluminum fluoride, sulfuric acid, synthetic cryolite, calcium fluoride and calcium sulfate are produced under the Gypsos brand. Aluminum fluoride is produced in five parallel production lines. The last two built, in 2008 and 2013, are equipped with highly efficient double-bed reactors. Sulfuric acid is produced in two parallel plants, the first built in 2002 and the second, of the same capacity, in 2013. The raw material for both plants is molten sulfur from nearby Saras in Sarroch's refinery, which guarantees the absence of dangerous dust. The process is highly exothermic and, thanks to a very efficient heat recovery, huge quantities of steam are generated and sent to two turbine generators of 5 and 7 MW capacity. These ones, starting from a zero-km by-product, allow the plant to be self-sufficient in terms of sulfuric acid, steam and electricity without the use of fuels, carbon dioxide emissions or other greenhouse gases.

In 2010 the group acquired ICIB, which had been the main producer of hydrofluoric acid since 1949, and settled in its Treviglio plant, in Bergamo area. Merging this plant and the one in Porto Marghera,  is produced a quantity of hydrofluoric acid equal to 10,000 tons per year.

With the acquisition of Noralf in 2013, it is also present in Norway in the Odda plant, capable of producing around 40,000 tons per year of aluminum fluoride.

About the mining sector, in Great Britain it has been present since 2012 at Cavendish Mill in Derbyshire within the Peak District National Park, where fluorite is extracted and subsequently transported to the various plants. In the same country there is also a plant, dated 1984, in Sheffield (South Yorkshire) where titanium powders and granules are produced.

In Switzerland, the entire magnesium sector is located in Martigny (Canton of Valais). The site specializes in the production of magnesium anodes for the cathodic protection of water heaters, tanks and pipelines. Also in Switzerland, in Zurich and Lausanne, there are offices dedicated to the group's trading activities.

Finally, with the subsidiary Simplis Logistics, the company operates in Manama, Bahrain, in the logistics sector and in the transport of production materials.

In 2018 Fluorsid acquired from Solvay its plant in Porto Marghera, in the industrial area of Venice. Indeed here there was one of the biggest productions of hydrofluoric acid, in both anhydrous and aqueous form, and of fluoroderivatives (calcium sulphate). The company therefore settled here its company branch called Fluorsid Alkeemia. The plant had an area of 125,000 square meters and every year 27,000 tons of anhydrous hydrofluoric acid and 100,000 tons of calcium sulphate were produced. In February 2021 it was selected by the Italian Ministry of Economic Development for a European Union Project of Common Interest for the development of innovative lithium battery cells and systems. In October 2021 Fluorsid sold the controlled company Alkeemia and its plant.

In 2021, with the establishment of Fluorsid Deutschland, the company arrived in Germany at the Höchst plant, near Frankfurt Airport. The plant mainly produced chlorodifluoromethane, a raw material for many fluorine polymers such as PTFE and some special fluoroelastomers. The production capacity of the plant was about 24,000 MT per year and is managed through the partner Nouryon, the original owner of the site. In October of the same year, together with the sale of the subsidiary Alkeemia, there has been the sale of the 50% stake in CF Carbons which ended the activities on in Germany.

Legal controversies 
In May 2017 Fluorsid was implicated in an investigation for environmental disaster which also involved its top management with accusations of conspiracy and environmental crimes. At the end of the events, the company and the reference company were declared extraneous to the conduct, because the technical choices were not being made by the top management of Fluorsid. The agents of the Regional Forestry Corps seized two areas containing polluting materials: one of three hectares, next to the Fluorsid plant in Macchiareddu, in Sardinia, where there were piles of materials stored outdoors and one of five hectares in Terrasili, in the municipality of Assemini, for the storage of various materials. The warrant contested the presence of contamination by dispersion of harmful dust containing fluorine, the contamination of the soil by diffusion of fluorine dust, then ending up on grazing lands, and the contamination of groundwater and livestock by heavy metals and inorganic compounds, and contamination of livestock by fluorine in Macchiareddu. The investigation closed in December 2018 bringing the number of suspects to 15, which then rose to 22 including managers of public control bodies.

On June 26, 2019, the company presented an investment plan of approximately 22 million euros to modernize the area around the Macchiareddu plant and further improve compliance with environmental safety. On 25 July of the same year 11 of the 22 suspects negotiated a sentence of 23 months' detention (but with suspended sentence) and a 7,000 euro fine for pollution, environmental disaster and illegal waste disposal, while the accusation of conspiracy was canceled. On 18 December 2019 the case was definitively closed with the dismissal of the positions of the remaining 11 suspects, which involved the managers of Fluorsid (including the president of Cagliari Calcio and of the company itself Tommaso Giulini) and its subsidiaries and managers of the Sardinian Healthcare Board (ATS) and of the Sardinian Environmental Defense Board (ARPAS). The plea deal, as well as the final setting of the accusation, confirmed the extraneousness of Fluorsid and its top management with respect to the conduct.

Governance 
Fluorsid consists of eight subsidiaries that report directly to the original company established in 1969. In fact, they maintain organizational charts and legal entities, but are unified from a commercial and brand point of view, with their name preceded by that of the Group, precisely Fluorsid. Management is led by the Fluorsid Board of directors to which the BoDs of the subsidiaries also refer. With regard to organizational reports, the plant managers of the subsidiaries report directly to the Fluorsid's Chief Executive Officer. The entire Fluorsid is part of the holding called Fluorsid Group, that has the full ownership of the professional football club Cagliari Calcio, the main sports club in Sardinia, and the minority shareholdings in three other companies of the chemical and metal field: SEMP, Simplis Logistics and Laminazione Sottile.

Current structure

Former assets

References

External links 
 - Official Website
 - Official Website of the holding

Companies based in Sardinia
Chemical companies of Italy
Italian companies established in 1969
Multinational companies headquartered in Italy